Shane Hannah (born October 21, 1971) is a former American football offensive guard in the National Football League for the Dallas Cowboys. He was selected by the Dallas Cowboys in the second round (63rd overall) of the 1995 NFL Draft. He played college football at Michigan State University.

Early years
Hannah attended Valley View High School, where he played offensive tackle. As a senior, he was selected the Ohio Division III high school lineman of the year. He lettered in basketball, setting a school record of 23 rebounds in one game. He also practiced track, recording 153' 6' in the discus throw.

He accepted a football scholarship from Michigan State University. He became the starter at left tackle in the second game of his redshirt freshman season against the University of Notre Dame and would never relinquish the position. As a junior, he didn't allow a sack during the season.

He was a four-year starter at left tackle and was a key player in the Spartans potent ground attack. He tied the school record for most starts (44) by an offensive lineman, while receiving second-team All-Big Ten honors as a junior and senior.

Professional career

Dallas Cowboys
Hannah was selected by the Dallas Cowboys in the second round (63rd overall) of the 1995 NFL Draft, with the intention of playing him at offensive guard.

As a rookie, he suffered a torn lateral meniscus and a sprained posterior cruciate ligament in his right knee during the first preseason game, and was placed on the injured reserve list on August 27. The next year, he came back out of shape and overweight, which created tension with his coaches, that eventually led to his decision to quit the team during preseason on July 19 and announce his retirement.

After spending a year out of football, the Cowboys gave him a second chance in 1997, but was released before the season started on August 19.

New York Jets
On September 24, 1997, the New York Jets signed him to their practice squad. He was waived on October 20.

Carolina Panthers
In 1998, he signed as a free agent with the Carolina Panthers, but was released before the season started on August 23.

References

1971 births
Living people
People from Germantown, Ohio
Players of American football from Ohio
American football offensive guards
Michigan State Spartans football players
Dallas Cowboys players